The 2009–10 Nashville Predators season was the Nashville Predators' 12th season in the National Hockey League.

Pre-season

Regular season

Divisional standings

Conference standings

Game log

Playoffs

Player stats

Skaters
Note: GP = Games played; G = Goals; A = Assists; Pts = Points; +/− = Plus/minus; PIM = Penalty minutes

Goaltenders
Note: GP = Games played; TOI = Time on ice (minutes); W = Wins; L = Losses; OT = Overtime losses; GA = Goals against; GAA= Goals against average; SA= Shots against; SV= Saves; Sv% = Save percentage; SO= Shutouts

†Denotes player spent time with another team before joining Predators. Stats reflect time with the Predators only.
‡Traded mid-season
Bold/italics denotes franchise record

Awards and records

Records

Milestones

Awards

Transactions 

The Predators have been involved in the following transactions during the 2009–10 season.

Trades 

|}

Free agents acquired

Free agents lost

Claimed via waivers

Lost via waivers

Player signings

Draft picks 

Nashville's picks at the 2009 NHL Entry Draft in Montreal, Quebec.

See also 
 2009–10 NHL season

Farm teams

References

External links
2009–10 Nashville Predators season at ESPN
2009–10 Nashville Predators season at Hockey Reference

Nashville Predators seasons
N
N
Nashville Predators
Nashville Predators